Eugene Daniel Jr. (born May 4, 1961) is a former professional American football cornerback who played 14 seasons in the National Football League (NFL) for the Indianapolis Colts  and Baltimore Ravens from 1984 to 1997. Daniel attended Louisiana State University. He was drafted by the Indianapolis Colts in the 8th round of the 1984 NFL Draft. In 1985 Daniel tied Albert Lewis of the Kansas City Chiefs for the AFC lead in interceptions, with 8. In 1995, Daniel recorded the longest interception return in Colts history, scoring on a 97-yard interception against the New York Jets. During his 12 years with the Indianapolis Colts, Daniel was a fan favorite and held many franchise longevity records since surpassed by quarterback Peyton Manning.

References

1961 births
Living people
Players of American football from Baton Rouge, Louisiana
American football cornerbacks
LSU Tigers football players
Indianapolis Colts players
Baltimore Ravens players
Ed Block Courage Award recipients